Batocera boisduvali, the great fig tree borer,  is a species of flat-faced longhorn beetle belonging to the subfamily Lamiinae of the family Cerambycidae.

Description
Batocera boisduvali is a large longhorn beetle reaching  of length.

The elytra of these beetles show a dark grey colour with white to yellowish spots.

Adults feed on the sap of the bark, while larvae bore tunnels into the trunk and larger branches. Larval host plants are native fig trees Ficus watkinsiana, Ficus rubiginosa, Ficus microphylla, Ficus ehretioides (Moraceae) and Alstonia scholaris (Apocynaceae).

Distribution and habitat
This species can be found in rainforests of New South Wales and Queensland (Australia).

References

Batocerini
Beetles of Australia
Beetles described in 1839